David Zirnhelt (born 1947) is a Canadian politician, businessman and rancher from British Columbia. A member of the British Columbia New Democratic Party, he was a Member of the Legislative Assembly (MLA) for Cariboo and Cariboo South from 1989 to 2001.

Early life and career 
Zirnhelt was born in Williams Lake, British Columbia, located in the Cariboo region of the province's central interior. He obtained undergraduate and graduate degrees from the University of British Columbia in political science and public administration, returning to the Williams Lake area, where he became a cattle rancher and a practitioner of horse logging.  He was also active as a consultant in various federal, provincial and First Nations projects related to public policy and economic development.

After graduating from university, Zirnhelt worked as a civil servant in the government of Pierre Trudeau as a member of the cabinet secretariat, and later became the British Columbia head of Opportunities for Youth.

Politics 
Zirnhelt's first entry into politics was in the 1969 British Columbia general election, where he stood as a candidate for the Liberal Party in the riding of Cariboo. He was unsuccessful in his run, placing third against victor Alex Fraser. Fraser's widow later recalled that despite his resounding victory, Fraser was impressed with Zirnhelt and that "if he was older [he] might have given him some trouble."

He was a director of the Cariboo Regional District from 1974 to 1977. In 1987, he was elected as a trustee of the Cariboo-Chilcotin School District. In 1989, following the death of Alex Fraser, Zirnhelt stood in the resulting by-election for Cariboo, this time as a member of the social democratic New Democratic Party. In a shock upset, Zirnhelt won the election; the riding had, until then, been a stronghold of the conservative British Columbia Social Credit Party for 37-years. Zirnhelt went on to be re-elected in 1991 and 1996 in the riding of Cariboo South (the old Cariboo riding was abolished with the 1991 election).

With the election of a New Democratic government in 1991, Premier Mike Harcourt appointed Zirnhelt minister of economic development, small business and trade. He was later minister of agriculture, fisheries and food. Following Harcourt's resignation, Premier Glen Clark appointed Zirnhelt minister of forests — a powerful portfolio in a province where forestry is a major economic sector. In that position, Zirnhelt initiated an intensive review of the province's forest practices, as concerns mounted over the logging of old growth forests and the insufficient restocking of logged areas by timber companies.

Zirnhelt failed in his attempt at re-election in 2001.

References

External links
Biography from the Legislative Assembly of British Columbia
Zirnhelt Ranch

1947 births
Living people
British Columbia New Democratic Party MLAs
British Columbia school board members
Canadian ranchers
Canadian people of German descent
Cariboo people
Members of the Executive Council of British Columbia
20th-century Canadian legislators
21st-century Canadian legislators